Liwang may refer to:

Liwang, Mechi, Nepal
Liwang, Pyuthan, Nepal
Liwang, Rolpa, Nepal